Brachyglene bracteola is a moth of the family Notodontidae first described by Carl Geyer in 1832. It is found from Venezuela east to Ceará, Brazil, and south at least as far as Rio de Janeiro.

Females show extensive wing-pattern variation.

References

Moths described in 1832
Notodontidae of South America